Joseph Monteith  (29 March 1852 – 10 Oct 1911) DL, JP, of Carstairs, County Lanark, Knight of Malta, was Deputy Lieutenant for the County of Lanark, Scotland.

Family

He was the son of Robert Monteith, DL, JP, of Carstairs, by Wilhelmina Anne, daughter of Joseph Mellish of Blythe, Nottinghamshire.

On 13 October 1874 he married Florence Catharine Mary Herbert (17 April 1850 – 23 Jan 1900), daughter of John Arthur Edward Herbert and the Hon. Augusta Charlotte Elizabeth Hall of Llanarth Court at Llanarth, Monmouthshire. The children from this marriage were:
Major Henry Monteith, b. Aug 1876; Major in the Lanarkshire Yeomanry; k.a. Gallipoli, 27 Dec 1915.
Revd. Robert Monteith, SJ, CF; b. 6 Nov 1877; died of wounds received in action 27 Nov 1917.
Major Joseph Basil Lawrence Monteith, CBE, DL, JP, b. 1878 Major in the Gordon Highlanders; married Dorothea, daughter of Sir Charles Nicholson, 1st Baronet of Harrington Gardens and had issue.
Francis Monteith, lived in Vancouver.
Major Edmund Monteith, Major in the Maratha Light Infantry, married and had issue.
Major John Monteith, Major in the South Wales Borderers
Captain George Monteith, Captain in the Gordon Highlanders, killed in the First World War
Gertrude Mary Monteith, nun of the Sacred Heart order
Gertrude Augusta Monteith
Augusta Catherine Monteith, nun of the Sacred Heart order
Catherine Monteith
Margaret Monica Mary Monteith,
Christian Paula Mary Monteith

Career

He resided at Carstairs House (now called Monteith House). The estate comprised 5581 acres. He undertook much improvement work, including the provision of electric power for the house from a hydro electric plant at Jarviswood. He also used this electric power to power the Carstairs House Tramway.

He was a Justice of the Peace for the County of Lanark. He was appointed Deputy Lieutenant for the County of Lanark.

He submitted a patent to the patent office on 20 July 1875 for “improvements in the construction of velocipedes”.

References

1852 births
1911 deaths
Deputy Lieutenants of Lanarkshire
Scottish Roman Catholics
Lanarkshire Yeomanry officers